Rizeh (also Romanized as Rīzeh) is a village in Faruj Rural District, in the Central District of Faruj County, North Khorasan Province, Iran. At the 2006 census, its population was 386, in 86 families.

References 

Populated places in Faruj County